A Soulful Christmas is the 22nd studio album and second Christmas album by American musician James Brown. The album was released in 1968, by King Records.

Track listing

References

1968 albums
1968 Christmas albums
James Brown albums
Albums produced by James Brown
Christmas albums by American artists
King Records (United States) albums
Rhythm and blues Christmas albums